Ministrymon is a genus of butterflies in the family Lycaenidae. The species of this genus are found in the Nearctic and Neotropical realms.

Species
Ministrymon albimimicus (Johnson, 1986)
Ministrymon arola (Hewitson, 1868)
Ministrymon arthuri Bálint, Johnson & Austin, [1999]
Ministrymon azia (Hewitson, 1873)
Ministrymon cleon (Fabricius, 1775)
Ministrymon clytie (Edwards, 1877)
Ministrymon coronta (Hewitson, 1874)
Ministrymon cruenta (Gosse, 1880)
Ministrymon fostera (Schaus, 1902)
Ministrymon gamma (Druce, 1909)
Ministrymon inoa (Godman & Salvin, [1887])
Ministrymon janevicroy Glassberg, 2013
Ministrymon leda (Edwards, 1882)
Ministrymon ligia (Hewitson, 1877)
Ministrymon megacles (Stoll, [1780])
Ministrymon ollantaitamba (Johnson, Miller & Herrera, 1992)
Ministrymon phrutus (Geyer, 1832)
Ministrymon sanguinalis (Burmeister, 1878)
Ministrymon una (Hewitson, 1873)
Ministrymon zilda (Hewitson, 1873)

References

 , 1998: New species of Eumaeini (Lycaenidae) from Southeastern Brazil II. Review of regional Ministrymon and descriptions of new species (Lepidoptera: Lycaenidae). Annales historico-naturales Musei nationalis hungarici 90: 195-214. Full article: .
, 1992: Two new butterflies (Lepidoptera: Lycaenidae) from Cuba. Caribbean Journal of Science 28 (3-4): 149-157. Full article: .
, 2013: A butterfly with olive green eyes discovered in the United States and the Neotropics (Lepidoptera, Lycaenidae, Eumaeini). Zookeys 305: 1-20. Full article: .

Eumaeini
Lycaenidae of South America
Lycaenidae genera